Joseph Gerald Finnegan (born 1 October 1942) is a retired Irish judge who served as a Judge of the Supreme Court from 2006 to 2012, President of the High Court from 2001 to 2006 and a Judge of the High Court from 1999 to 2006. 

Finnegan was technically the second highest ranking judge in Ireland while he was President of the High Court and was an ex officio member of the Supreme Court that he was subsequently appointed to as a full member.

He was educated at Synge Street CBS and St. Mary's College Dundalk. He attended University College Dublin and was awarded degrees of Bachelor of Civil Law and Bachelor of Laws. He qualified as a solicitor in 1966. He was Assistant Secretary of the Incorporated Law Society of Ireland from 1968 to 1973. He was called to the Bar in 1978 and became Senior Counsel in 1990. He practised mainly in general common law and chancery matters. He had a particular interest in conveyancing and title related litigation. He was appointed to the High Court in 1999 and was appointed President of the High Court in 2001, a position which he held until his appointment to the Supreme Court of Ireland in December 2006. He retired from the Supreme Court in 2012.

He was a member of the Board of the Courts Service from 2001 to 2006, and sat on the Finance Committee and Remuneration Committee and was chairman of its Audit Committee. He has a keen interest in legal education and has been a member of the Education Committee of the Honorable Society of the King's Inns since 2000.

He is a Bencher of the Honorable Society of King's Inns and a Bencher of the Honorable Society of Middle Temple.

References 

Living people
1942 births
Lawyers from Dublin (city)
Presidents of the High Court (Ireland)
20th-century Irish judges
Alumni of University College Dublin
People educated at Synge Street CBS
Alumni of King's Inns
21st-century Irish judges
People educated at St Mary's College, Dundalk